İbrahim Çolak may refer to:

İbrahim Çolak (officer) (1881–1944), officer of the Ottoman Army and the Turkish Army
İbrahim Çolak (gymnast) (born 1995), Turkish artistic gymnast